David John Neville (September 5, 1908 – October 14, 1991) was a Canadian ice hockey player who competed in the 1936 Winter Olympics.

Although Neville was a member of the Royal Montreal Hockey Club, the Canadian ice hockey selection committee for the 1936 Winter Olympics chose to add Neville (along with teammates Hugh Farquharson and Ralph St. Germain) to join the Port Arthur Bearcats to represent Canada in ice hockey at the 1936 Winter Olympics. Neville scored eight goals in eight games to help Team Canada win the silver Olympic medal.

In 1987 he was inducted into the Northwestern Ontario Sports Hall of Fame as a member of that Olympic team.

References

External links
profile

1908 births
1991 deaths
Canadian ice hockey forwards
Ice hockey people from Ontario
Ice hockey players at the 1936 Winter Olympics
Medalists at the 1936 Winter Olympics
Montreal Royals players
Olympic ice hockey players of Canada
Olympic medalists in ice hockey
Olympic silver medalists for Canada
Sportspeople from Hamilton, Ontario